Phidippus is a genus in the family Salticidae (jumping spiders). Some of the largest jumping spiders inhabit this genus, and many species are characterized by their brilliant, iridescent green chelicerae. Phidippus is distributed almost exclusively in North America, with the exception of two exported species (Phidippus audax and Phidippus regius). , there were about 80 described species in the genus. Species previously described in Phidippus which are found in India and Bangladesh do not belong in this genus.

Name
The genus name is likely derived from Cicero's speech Pro Rege Deiotaro (Speech in Behalf of King Deiotarus): Phidippus was a slave who was physician to King Deiotaros. Literally, the word means "one who spares horses" in Ancient Greek.

The name for the jumping spider family, Salticidae, also comes from the verb "to jump" in Latin.

Species
, the World Spider Catalog accepted the following species:
 Phidippus adonis Edwards, 2004 – Mexico
 Phidippus adumbratus Gertsch, 1934 – United States
Phidippus aeneidens Taczanowski, 1878 – Peru
Phidippus albocinctus Caporiacco, 1947 – Guyana
 Phidippus amans Edwards, 2004 – Mexico
 Phidippus albulatus F. O. P-Cambridge, 1901 – Mexico
 Phidippus apacheanus Chamberlin & Gertsch, 1929 – United States, Mexico, Cuba
 Phidippus ardens Peckham & Peckham, 1901 – United States, Mexico
 Phidippus arizonensis (Peckham & Peckham, 1883) – United States, Mexico
 Phidippus asotus Chamberlin & Ivie, 1933 – United States, Mexico
 Phidippus audax (Hentz, 1845) – North America, introduced in Hawaii, Nicobar Islands
 Phidippus aureus Edwards, 2004 – United States
Phidippus bengalensis Tikader, 1977 – India
Phidippus bhimrakshiti Gajbe, 2004 – India
 Phidippus bidentatus F. O. P.-Cambridge, 1901 – United States to Costa Rica
Phidippus birabeni Mello-Leitão, 1944 – Argentina
 Phidippus boei Edwards, 2004 – United States, Mexico
 Phidippus borealis Banks, 1895 – United States, Canada, Alaska
Phidippus calcuttaensis Biswas, 1984 – India
 Phidippus californicus Peckham & Peckham, 1901 – North America
 Phidippus cardinalis (Hentz, 1845) – United States, Mexico
 Phidippus carneus Peckham & Peckham, 1896 – United States, Mexico
 Phidippus carolinensis Peckham & Peckham, 1909 – United States, Mexico
 Phidippus cerberus Edwards, 2004 – Mexico
 Phidippus clarus Keyserling, 1885 – North America
 Phidippus comatus Peckham & Peckham, 1901 – North America
 Phidippus concinnus Gertsch, 1934 – United States
 Phidippus cruentus F. O. P.-Cambridge, 1901 – Mexico
 Phidippus cryptus Edwards, 2004 – United States, Canada
 Phidippus dianthus Edwards, 2004 – Mexico
Phidippus exlineae Caporiacco, 1955 – Venezuela
 Phidippus felinus Edwards, 2004 – United States
 Phidippus georgii Peckham & Peckham, 1896 – Mexico to El Salvador
Phidippus guianensis Caporiacco, 1947 – Guyana
Phidippus hingstoni Mello-Leitão, 1948 – Guyana
 Phidippus insignarius C. L. Koch, 1846 – United States
 Phidippus johnsoni (Peckham & Peckham, 1883) – North America
 Phidippus kastoni Edwards, 2004 – United States
Phidippus khandalaensis Tikader, 1977 – India
 Phidippus lynceus Edwards, 2004 – United States
 Phidippus maddisoni Edwards, 2004 – Mexico
Phidippus majumderi Biswas, 1999 – Bangladesh
 Phidippus mimicus Edwards, 2004 – Mexico
 Phidippus morpheus Edwards, 2004 – United States, Mexico
 Phidippus mystaceus (Hentz, 1846) – United States
 Phidippus nikites Chamberlin & Ivie, 1935 – United States, Mexico
 Phidippus octopunctatus (Peckham & Peckham, 1883) – United States, Mexico
 Phidippus olympus Edwards, 2004 – United States
 Phidippus otiosus (Hentz, 1846) – United States
 Phidippus pacosauritus Edwards, 2020 – Mexico
 Phidippus phoenix Edwards, 2004 – United States, Mexico
 Phidippus pius Scheffer, 1905 – United States to Costa Rica
 Phidippus pompatus Edwards, 2004 – Mexico
 Phidippus princeps (Peckham & Peckham, 1883) – United States, Canada
 Phidippus pruinosus Peckham & Peckham, 1909 – United States
Phidippus punjabensis Tikader, 1974 – India
 Phidippus purpuratus Keyserling, 1885 – United States, Canada
 Phidippus putnami (Peckham & Peckham, 1883) – United States
 Phidippus regius C. L. Koch, 1846 (United States, West Indies, Easter Island – introduced)
 Phidippus richmani Edwards, 2004 – United States
Phidippus tenuis (Kraus, 1955) – El Salvador
 Phidippus texanus Banks, 1906 – United States, Mexico
 Phidippus tigris Edwards, 2004 – United States
Phidippus tirapensis Biswas & Biswas, 2006 – India
 Phidippus toro Edwards, 1978 – United States, Mexico
 Phidippus tux Pinter, 1970 – United States, Mexico
 Phidippus tyrannus Edwards, 2004 – United States, Mexico
 Phidippus tyrrelli Peckham & Peckham, 1901 – North America
 Phidippus ursulus Edwards, 2004 – United States
 Phidippus venus Edwards, 2004 – Mexico
 Phidippus vexans Edwards, 2004 – United States
 Phidippus whitmani Peckham & Peckham, 1909 – United States, Canada
 Phidippus workmani Peckham & Peckham, 1901 – United States
Phidippus yashodharae Tikader, 1977 – India (Andaman Is.)
Phidippus zebrinus Mello-Leitão, 1945 – Argentina
 Phidippus zethus Edwards, 2004 – Mexico

Misplaced species
In addition to the species above, several species have been misplaced in the genus (according to Edwards' revision) but have yet to be transferred to other genera. These include:
 Phidippus aeneidens Taczanowski, 1878 – Peru
 Phidippus albocinctus Caporiacco, 1947 – Guyana
 Phidippus bengalensis Tikader, 1977 – India
 Phidippus bhimrakshiti Gajbe, 2004 – India
 Phidippus birabeni Mello-Leitão, 1944 – Argentina
 Phidippus calcuttaensis Biswas, 1984 – India
 Phidippus exlineae Caporiacco, 1955 – Venezuela
 Phidippus guianensis Caporiacco, 1947 – Guyana
 Phidippus hingstoni Mello-Leitão, 1948 – Guyana
 Phidippus khandalaensis Tikader, 1977 – India
 Phidippus majumderi Biswas, 1999 – Bangladesh
 Phidippus punjabensis Tikader, 1974 – India
 Phidippus tenuis Kraus, 1955 – El Salvador
 Phidippus tirapensis Biswas & Biswas, 2006 – India
 Phidippus yashodharae Tikader, 1977 – Andaman Is.
 Phidippus zebrinus Mello-Leitão, 1945 – Argentina

References

Bibliography
  (1965): Observations on Three Species of Phidippus Jumping Spiders (Araneae: Salticidae). Psyche 72:133-147 PDF (P. californicus = P. coccineus, P. apacheanus, P. octopunctatus = P. opifex)
  (editors) (2005): Spiders of North America: An Identification Manual. American Arachnological Society 
  (2004): Revision of the jumping spiders of the genus Phidippus (Araneae: Salticidae). Occasional Papers of the Florida State Collection of Arthropods 11: i-viii, 1–156, 350 figs.

External links

Videos
 David Edwin Hill: Portrait of feeding female Phidippus audax – Video
 David Edwin Hill: Variable female forms of the jumping spider Phidippus clarus – Video

Pictures
"Bold Jumping Spider" - Phidippus audax
 Awesome Spiders: Photographs of P. arizonensis
Phidippus clarus diagnostic photographs, male and female specimens
Phidippus mystaceus photographs, adult male specimen
Phidippus princeps reference photographs
Phidippus otiosus adult male specimen
Catalog of genus Phidippus
 Pictures of Phidippus species
 Picture of Phidippus species (free for noncommercial use)

Salticidae
Spiders of North America
Salticidae genera